Joel Wesley Morgan (born September 5, 1973), who goes by the stage name Wess Morgan, is an American gospel musician, and pastor. He started his music career, in 2006, with the release of Look at Me Now by Oak Tree Records. His second album, Under an Open Heaven, Vol. 1, was released in 2010 by Bowtie World Music alongside Flipside Music, and this album was his Billboard magazine breakthrough release on the Gospel Albums chart. The song, "I  Choose to Worship", was put on the WOW Gospel 2012 album. The subsequent album, Under an Open Heaven, Vol. 2, was released by Bowtie World Music in 2012, and it charted on the aforementioned chart. He released, Livin, in 2014 by Bowtie Music, and it charted on the aforementioned chart. Wess Morgan was a cast member on Tyler Perry's stage play Laugh to Keep from Crying

Early life
Morgan was born in Moss Point, Mississippi, on September 5, 1973, as Joel Wesley Morgan, whose father is Joseph and mother Yolanda, and he has an older brother, Joseph, and a younger sister, and they were raised in Nashville, Tennessee.

Music career
His music career commenced in 2006, with the album, Look at Me Now, that was released by Oak Tree Records. The subsequent album, Under an Open Heaven, Vol. 1, was released on October 19, 2010 by Bowtie World Music alongside Flipside Music, and this album was his Billboard magazine breakthrough release on the Gospel Albums chart at No. 10. This album had the single, I Choose to Worship, that charted at No. 4 on the Hot Gospel Songs chart, and was placed on the compilation album, WOW Gospel 2012. He released, Under an Open Heaven, Vol. 2, on December 11, 2012, and this charted on the aforementioned chart at No. 31. His fourth album, Livin, was released in 2014 by Bowtie Music, and this placed at No. 6 on the Gospel Albums chart.

Personal life
Morgan was married for eighteen years to Betsy, they lived in Nashville, Tennessee, that ended in divorce in the middle of 2013. He married Danielle Walker in January 2014, she gave birth to his child later that year.

Discography

References

External links
 Official website

1973 births
Living people
American male musicians
American gospel singers
Musicians from Mississippi
Musicians from Tennessee
Songwriters from Mississippi
Songwriters from Tennessee
21st-century American male singers
21st-century American singers
American male songwriters